On June 1, 2008, a fire broke out on the backlot of Universal Studios Hollywood, an American film studio and theme park in the San Fernando Valley area of Los Angeles County, California. The fire began when a worker used a blowtorch to warm asphalt shingles that were being applied to a facade. He left before checking that all spots had cooled, and a three-alarm fire broke out. Nine firefighters and a Los Angeles County sheriffs' deputy sustained minor injuries. The fire was extinguished after 24 hours.

Universal Pictures said the fire destroyed a three-acre portion of the Universal backlot, including the attraction King Kong Encounter and 40,000 to 50,000 archived digital video and film copies. A 2019 exposé from The New York Times Magazine asserted that the fire also destroyed 118,000 to 175,000 audio master tapes belonging to Universal Music Group (UMG). This included original recordings belonging to some of the best-selling artists worldwide. UMG disputed the report, though the CEO, Lucian Grainge, acknowledged that "the loss of even a single piece of archived material is heartbreaking".

Fire
On June 1, 2008, a three-alarm fire broke out on the Universal Studios Lot, the backlot of Universal Studios. The fire started when a worker was using a blowtorch to warm asphalt shingles being applied to a facade. The Los Angeles County Fire Department (LACoFD) reported that Brownstone Street, New York Street, New England Street, the King Kong attraction, some structures that make up Courthouse Square, and the Video Vault, which contained duplicates of Universal's film library, had burned down. Aerial news footage captured the Courthouse building surviving its third fire, with only the west side slightly charred.

The LACoFD sent 516 firefighters, as well as two helicopters dropping water. Nine firefighters and a Los Angeles County sheriff's deputy sustained minor injuries. The fire took at least 12 hours to extinguish, in part because of the low water pressure due to the low capacity of Universal's pipes; firefighters had to tap streams and lakes.

Universal executives initially said the fire destroyed 40,000 to 50,000 archived digital video and film copies of Universal movies and TV shows, some almost a century old, and including the films Knocked Up and Atonement, the NBC series Law & Order, The Office, and Miami Vice, and the CBS series I Love Lucy. Universal president Ron Meyer told the media that "nothing irreplaceable was lost" and that the company had duplicates of everything destroyed. Universal replaced the King Kong attraction with King Kong: 360 3-D, based on the 2005 King Kong film.

2019 New York Times report
In June 2019, The New York Times Magazine published an investigative article by freelance journalist Jody Rosen that alleged that the damage was far more serious than Universal had said.

The fire destroyed Building 6197, a warehouse adjoining the King Kong attraction. In addition to more videos, it housed a huge archive containing multiple copies of audio and video recordings, documents ranging from legal papers to liner notes, and packaging materials and artwork belonging to Universal Music Group (UMG).  The collection included the catalogues of UMG's West Coast labels including Chess, Decca, MCA, Geffen, Interscope, A&M, Impulse!, and their subsidiary labels.  Rosen estimated the individual items lost range from 118,000 to 175,000 album and 45-rpm single master tapes, phonograph master discs, lacquers (also known as acetates), as well as all the documentation contained in the tape boxes. The article alleged some tapes contained unreleased recordings such as outtakes, alternative versions of released material, and instrumental "submaster" multitracks created for dubbing and mixdown. However, UMG found only one unreleased album potentially affected in the fire, and they located multiple copies of that recording and could still release that album in the future if the artist wishes to. Randy Aronson, manager of the vault at the time, estimates that the masters of as many as 500,000 individual tracks were lost.

Rosen argued master recordings are irreplaceable, even if copies exist, because the original recording "contains the record's details in their purest form," citing Andy Zax, a Grammy-nominated producer and writer who works on reissued recordings. However, that claim has been disputed by many audio experts. including Analog Planet editor Michael Fremer, who said that due to use and natural decay, often safety copies become a superior source for reissues. UMG stated that even when the original master is available, the company often works from duplicates or digitized versions because the fidelity of the original master has deteriorated from overuse or from chemical interactions over time or for other technical reasons. UMG said it reissues thousands of recordings a year, and each project presents a unique set of challenges to overcome. In each case, UMG's team of experts use the highest fidelity recordings possible.

Among the possible losses were the entire AVI Records catalog, all of Decca's masters from the 1930s to the 1950s, most of the original Chess masters, which included artists such as Chuck Berry, Muddy Waters, and Howlin' Wolf, as well as most of John Coltrane's master tapes from his period signed to Impulse! Records. On Twitter, Rosen stated that the Coltrane masters were among the most checked-out Impulse! items in the vault, and a source had told him that the masters for A Love Supreme were likely elsewhere during the fire.

Two weeks later, Rosen wrote a follow-up article, listing at least 700 additional artists named in internal UMG documents as possibly affected. Determining which recordings had been destroyed, or how much of an artist's discography had been affected, was impossible, he wrote. For example, Rosen said it was difficult to confirm whether the Neil Young recordings listed in the documents were the original master tapes of the albums he recorded for Geffen Records in the 1980s, or session outtakes from those records. Rosen tweeted that the documents also listed several Broadway cast recordings among the tapes destroyed. Several nonmusical audio recordings were reported as destroyed, including the original recording of Martin Luther King Jr.'s 1968 "Remaining Awake During a Great Revolution" sermon delivered at the Washington National Cathedral.

Despite Rosen's reporting, at the end of the second article, even The New York Times acknowledged they could not definitely state that any master recordings had actually been lost in the fire, stating "It is not possible to assert definitively which masters were burned in the fire, nor can it be said categorically that all of these artists did in fact lose masters. It also cannot be determined exactly how many of the destroyed masters were primary-source originals."

Artists' responses
Bryan Adams, Semisonic drummer Jacob Slichter, and Counting Crows singer Adam Duritz said they had been told that UMG had misplaced their tapes. Richard Carpenter told the Times he had been informed about the destruction of his tapes by a UMG employee while he was working on a reissue, and only after Carpenter had made multiple, persistent inquiries.  Following the publication of Rosen's articles, several affected musicians posted reactions on social media, with some noting specific tapes that may have been lost.  For instance, singer-songwriter Jill Sobule said she had lost two masters in the fire, including tapes for an unreleased album produced by Joe Jackson, but Sobule later said UMG informed her that none of her tapes had been lost, including the unreleased album.

Several other artists also contradicted The Times' reporting, stating their recordings had not been affected by the fire. Nirvana said on Twitter that all of their tapes are safe as did Sheryl Crow, with UMG confirming, "masters for all of Crow's A&M-released albums survived the fire." The Canadian band the Tragically Hip reported on their website that The New York Times incorrectly listed them among those who had lost tapes in the fire. Drummer Johnny Fay wrote that all of their material had been relocated to Canada in 2001. Beck posted that his losses were minimal and that none of his master recordings had been lost. Smash Mouth confirmed their recordings were not destroyed.

Within two weeks of Rosen's article, five plaintiffs (singer-songwriter Steve Earle, the estates of the late Tupac Shakur and Tom Petty, and the bands Hole and Soundgarden) filed a class-action lawsuit in federal court against UMG. In their complaint, the plaintiffs claimed UMG never told artists about the effects of the fire and had breached their contracts by failing to properly secure its master tape collection.  They further alleged that UMG did not share insurance or legal payouts received as a result of the fire. Every plaintiff except for Tom Petty's ex-wife dropped out of the complaint after UMG provided artists with a list of their recordings in the company's archives.

On July 17, Universal moved to dismiss the class-action lawsuit.  On August 16, 2019, Hole dropped out of the lawsuit after UMG assured them that the band's masters were not affected by the fire. Slightly over a month later, UMG also claimed that Shakur, Earle, and Petty did not lose their masters in the fire, and that an investigation with Soundgarden was still going on. Shakur and Earle would also later drop out as plaintiffs after learning their master tapes hadn't been harmed.

Five days later, UMG demanded Soundgarden drop the suit, which the label had also moved to dismiss, citing documentary proof that the label had informed the band about the lost masters in 2015 and accusing their lawyer of "[failing] to conduct presuit diligence in your rush to be the first to file." The surviving band members declined. "Their arbitrary deadlines have zero force or effect," Howard King, their attorney, told Rolling Stone. "Until UMG reveals what it collected for their litigation claims to extensive damage to master recordings, we cannot accept their belated claim that no damages were actually suffered." UMG's dismissal motion also publicly confirmed that master tapes for Soundgarden's Badmotorfinger album had been destroyed in the fire, and that members of the group had been made aware of the destruction in 2015 while they were working on a remaster of the album that was eventually completed with a backup safety copy. In December 2019, district court judge John Kronstadt ruled that Universal must hand over discovery evidence, and denied the label's request to postpone the delivery.

In March 2020, Soundgarden and the Shakur estate dropped out of the class action against UMG. On March 23, Steve Earle also dropped out, leaving Tom Petty's widow as the only remaining plaintiff. The lawsuit was dismissed by Kronstadt on April 6, 2020, with a refiled complaint dismissed with prejudice on March 29, 2021. After the lawsuit was dismissed, UMG said The Times "has a responsibility to explain why its editors continue to stand behind a story that has been disproven with incontrovertible evidence from both UMG and many of the artists named in the story."

UMG response
Since its publication, UMG has disputed Rosen's article, saying it contained "numerous inaccuracies" and "fundamental misunderstandings of the scope of the incident and affected assets". UMG said it was unable to disclose details due to "constraints".

In a Billboard interview, UMG archivist Patrick Kraus said that several masters of John Coltrane, Muddy Waters,  and Ahmad Jamal recordings, plus items from the catalogs of Nashboro Records, Chess Records, and Impulse! Records survived the fire and were still in Universal's archive. Rosen responded in his June 25 piece, noting that some of the masters that Kraus had mentioned may have survived the fire because they were being used for remastering projects at the time, or were not the primary source master. Aronson also confirmed to Rosen that the vast majority of items in the vault at the time of the fire were original, primary source master recordings. However, UMG stated the vault, which mostly contained duplicate tapes and not original masters, was a third empty at the time of the fire because the company had already begun transferring assets to its Iron Mountain facility.

In an email to staff following the publication of Rosen's story, Lucian Grainge said he was forming a team of researchers to provide artists with definitive information and confirmed that UMG had suffered a serious loss of archival material. Grainge wrote: "While I've been somewhat relieved by early reports from our team that many of the assertions and subsequent speculation are not accurate, one thing is clear: the loss of even a single piece of archived material is heartbreaking." He wrote that it was "completely unacceptable" that their artists did not know the details and pledged to deliver "answers". On June 26, Kraus issued a memo to staff which detailed UMG's plan to determine which assets had been affected.

A month after the story broke, Kraus issued an internal note to Universal staff, which claimed that his research at the time had found only 22 original master recordings by five artists had been lost in the fire, and that backup copies had been found for each lost master. He added that UMG had been fielding requests from over 200 artists and their representatives. Kraus said his team had reviewed over 26,000 assets by 30 artists, of which 424 assets (including 349 audio recordings) might have been lost. On November 4, 2019, Scott Edelman of Gibson Dunn, an attorney for UMG, told U.S. District Judge John A. Kronstadt that UMG is the owner of the recordings and that artists' contracts provide for payments through royalties, not insurance claims.

A February 2020 court filing by UMG confirmed that master tapes from at least 19 artists had been damaged or destroyed in the fire. The artists whom UMG confirmed were affected are Bryan Adams, ...And You Will Know Us by the Trail of Dead, David Baerwald, Beck, Sheryl Crow, Peter Frampton, Jimmy Eat World, Elton John, Michael McDonald, Nirvana, Les Paul, R.E.M., Slayer, Sonic Youth, Soundgarden, the Surfaris, Suzanne Vega, White Zombie and Y&T. However, Billboard wrote that "UMG says original digital master recordings for Nirvana, Beck, Bryan Adams, Sheryl Crow, Jimmy Eat World, Suzanne Vega, White Zombie and Yesterday & Today were affected, but it has replacements or digital clones of these assets. R.E.M had one song from a soundtrack affected but UMG has copies in the same format."

List of artists affected, according to The New York Times

According to The New York Times Magazine, artists whose original master recordings were destroyed in whole or part in the 2008 fire include:

 38 Special
 50 Cent
 Colonel Abrams
 Johnny Ace
 Bryan Adams
 Nat Adderley
 Aerosmith
 Rhett Akins
 Manny Albam
 Lorez Alexandria
 Gary Allan
 Red Allen
 Steve Allen
 Ames Brothers
 Gene Ammons
 Bill Anderson
 John Anderson
 The Andrews Sisters
 Lee Andrews & the Hearts
 Paul Anka
 Adam Ant
 Toni Arden
 Joan Armatrading
 Louis Armstrong
 Asia
 Asleep at the Wheel
 Audioslave
 Patti Austin
 Average White Band
 Hoyt Axton
 Albert Ayler
 Burt Bacharach
 Joan Baez                                                                                           
 Razzy Bailey
 Chet Baker
 Florence Ballard
 Hank Ballard
 Gato Barbieri
 Baja Marimba Band
 The Banana Splits
 Len Barry
 Count Basie
 Fontella Bass
 The Beat Farmers
 Sidney Bechet
 Beck
 Captain Beefheart
 Archie Bell & the Drells
 Vincent Bell
 Bell Biv DeVoe
 Louie Bellson
 David Benoit
 George Benson
 Berlin
 Elmer Bernstein
 Chuck Berry
 Nuno Bettencourt
 Stephen Bishop
 Blackstreet
 Art Blakey
 Hal Blaine
 Bobby "Blue" Bland
 Mary J. Blige
 The Blind Boys of Alabama
 Blink-182
 Blues Traveler
 Eddie Bo
 Pat Boone
 Boston
 Connee Boswell
 Eddie Boyd
 Jan Bradley
 Owen Bradley
 Oscar Brand
 Bob Braun
 Walter Brennan
 Jackie Brenston
 Teresa Brewer
 Edie Brickell & New Bohemians
 John Brim
 Willmer "Little Ax" Broadnax
 Lonnie Brooks
 Big Bill Broonzy
 Brothers Johnson
 Bobby Brown
 Clarence "Gatemouth" Brown
 Lawrence Brown
 Les Brown
 Marion Brown
 Marshall Brown
 Mel Brown
 Michael Brown
 Dave Brubeck
 Jimmy Buffett
 Carol Burnett
 T-Bone Burnett
 Dorsey Burnette
 Johnny Burnette
 Terry Callier
 Cab Calloway
 The Call
 Glen Campbell
 Captain & Tennille
 Captain Sensible
 Irene Cara
 Belinda Carlisle
 Carl Carlton
 Eric Carmen
 Hoagy Carmichael
 Kim Carnes
 Karen Carpenter
 Richard Carpenter
 The Carpenters
 Barbara Carr
 Benny Carter
 Betty Carter
 Carter Family
 Peter Case
 Alvin Cash
 Rosanne Cash
 Bobby Charles
 Ray Charles
 Chubby Checker
 Checkmates, Ltd.
 Cheech & Chong
 Cher
 Don Cherry
 Mark Chesnutt
 The Chi-Lites
 Eric Clapton
 Gene Clark
 Petula Clark
 Roy Clark
 Merry Clayton
 Jimmy Cliff
 Patsy Cline
 Rosemary Clooney
 Wayne Cochran
 Joe Cocker
 Gloria Coleman
 Ornette Coleman
 Mitty Collier
 Jazzbo Collins
 Judy Collins
 Colosseum
 Alice Coltrane
 John Coltrane
 Common
 Cookie and his Cupcakes
 Barbara Cook
 Rita Coolidge
 Stewart Copeland
 The Corsairs
 Dave "Baby" Cortez
 Bill Cosby
 Don Costa
 Clifford Coulter
 Counting Crows
 Coverdale•Page
 Warren Covington
 Deborah Cox
 James "Sugar Boy" Crawford
 Crazy Otto
 Marshall Crenshaw
 The Crew-Cuts
 Sonny Criss
 Bing Crosby
 Bob Crosby
 David Crosby
 Crosby & Nash
 Sheryl Crow
 Rodney Crowell
 The Crusaders
 The Cuff Links
 Xavier Cugat
 Tim Curry
 The Damned
 Danny & The Juniors
 Rodney Dangerfield
 Bobby Darin
 Helen Darling
 David & David
 Billy Davis Jr.
 Mac Davis
 Richard Davis
 Sammy Davis Jr.
 Chris de Burgh
 Lenny Dee
 Jack DeJohnette
 The Dells
 The Del-Vikings
 Sandy Denny
 Sugar Pie DeSanto
 The Desert Rose Band
 Dennis DeYoung
 Neil Diamond
 Bo Diddley
 Difford & Tilbrook
 Dillard & Clark
 The Dixie Hummingbirds
 Willie Dixon
 DJ Shadow
 Fats Domino
 Jimmy Donley
 Kenny Dorham
 Jimmy Dorsey
 Lee Dorsey
 Tommy Dorsey
 Lamont Dozier
 The Dramatics
 The Dream Syndicate
 The Dream Weavers
 Roy Drusky
 Jimmy Durante
 Deanna Durbin
 Eagles
 Steve Earle
 El Chicano
 Danny Elfman
 Yvonne Elliman
 Duke Ellington
 Cass Elliot
 Joe Ely
 John Entwistle
 Eminem
 Eric B. & Rakim
 Gil Evans
 Paul Evans
 Betty Everett
 Don Everly
 Extreme
 The Falcons
 Harold Faltermeyer
 Donna Fargo
 Art Farmer
 Freddy Fender
 Ferrante & Teicher
 Fever Tree
 The 5th Dimension
 Ella Fitzgerald
 The Fixx
 The Flamingos
 King Floyd
 The Flying Burrito Brothers
 John Fogerty
 Red Foley
 Eddie Fontaine
 The Four Aces
 Four Tops
 Peter Frampton
 Franke and the Knockouts
 Aretha Franklin
 C. L. Franklin
 Frazier River
 The Free Movement
 Glenn Frey
 Lefty Frizzell
 Curtis Fuller
 Jerry Fuller
 Lowell Fulson
 Harvey Fuqua
 Nelly Furtado
 Hank Garland
 Judy Garland
 Erroll Garner
 Jimmy Garrison
 Larry Gatlin
 Gene Loves Jezebel
 Barry Gibb
 Georgia Gibbs
 Terri Gibbs
 Dizzy Gillespie
 Gin Blossoms
 Tompall Glaser
 Glass Harp
 Tom Glazer
 Whoopi Goldberg
 Golden Earring
 Paul Gonsalves
 Benny Goodman
 Dexter Gordon
 Rosco Gordon
 Eydie Gormé
 Lesley Gore
 Teddy Grace
 Grand Funk Railroad
 Amy Grant
 Earl Grant
 The Grass Roots
 Dobie Gray
 Buddy Greco
 Al Green
 Keith Green
 Jack Greene
 Robert Greenidge
 Lee Greenwood
 Patty Griffin
 Nanci Griffith
 Dave Grusin
 Guns N' Roses
 Buddy Guy
 Buddy Hackett
 Charlie Haden
 Merle Haggard
 Bill Haley & His Comets
 Aaron Hall
 Lani Hall
 Chico Hamilton
 George Hamilton IV
 Vicky Hamilton
 Hamilton, Joe Frank & Reynolds
 Marvin Hamlisch
 Jan Hammer
 Lionel Hampton
 John Handy
 Slim Harpo
 Richard Harris
 Freddie Hart
 Dan Hartman
 Johnny Hartman
 Coleman Hawkins
 Dale Hawkins
 Richie Havens
 Roy Haynes
 Head East
 Heavy D
 Bobby Helms
 Don Henley
 Clarence "Frogman" Henry
 Woody Herman
 Milt Herth
 John Hiatt
 Al Hibbler
 Dan Hicks
 Monk Higgins
 Jessie Hill
 Earl Hines
 Roger Hodgson
 Hole
 Billie Holiday
 Jennifer Holliday
 Buddy Holly
 The Hollywood Flames
 Eddie Holman
 John Lee Hooker
 Stix Hooper
 Bob Hope
 Paul Horn
 Shirley Horn
 Big Walter Horton
 Thelma Houston
 Rebecca Lynn Howard
 Jan Howard
 Howlin' Wolf
 Freddie Hubbard
 Humble Pie
 Engelbert Humperdinck
 Brian Hyland
 The Impressions
 The Ink Spots
 Iron Butterfly
 Burl Ives
 Janet Jackson
 Joe Jackson
 Milt Jackson
 Ahmad Jamal
 Etta James
 Elmore James
 James Gang
 Keith Jarrett
 Jason & The Scorchers
 Jawbreaker
 Garland Jeffreys
 Beverly Jenkins
 Gordon Jenkins
 The Jets
 Jimmy Eat World
 Jodeci
 Johnnie & Joe
 The Joe Perry Project
 Elton John
 J. J. Johnson
 Al Jolson
 Booker T. Jones
 Elvin Jones
 George Jones
 Hank Jones
 Jack Jones
 Marti Jones
 Quincy Jones
 Rickie Lee Jones
 Tamiko Jones
 Tom Jones
 Louis Jordan
 The Jordanaires
 Jurassic 5
 Bert Kaempfert
 Kitty Kallen
 Kalin Twins
 Bob Kames
 Kansas
 Boris Karloff
 Sammy Kaye
 K-Ci & JoJo
 Toby Keith
 Gene Kelly
 Chaka Khan
 Andy Kim
 B.B. King
 Martin Luther King Jr.
 Wayne King
 The Kingsmen
 The Kingston Trio
 Roland Kirk
 Eartha Kitt
 John Klemmer
 Klymaxx
 Baker Knight
 Chris Knight
 Gladys Knight & the Pips
 Krokus
 Steve Kuhn
 Joachim Kühn
 Rolf Kühn
 Patti LaBelle
 L.A. Dream Team
 Frankie Laine
 Lambert, Hendricks & Ross
 Denise LaSalle
 Yusef Lateef
 Steve Lawrence
 Lafayette Leake
 Brenda Lee
 Laura Lee
 Leapy Lee
 Peggy Lee
 Danni Leigh
 The Lennon Sisters
 J.B. Lenoir
 Jerry Lee Lewis
 Jerry Lewis
 Meade Lux Lewis
 Ramsey Lewis
 Liberace
 Lifehouse
 Enoch Light
 The Lightning Seeds
 Limp Bizkit
 Lisa Loeb
 Little Milton
 Little River Band
 Little Walter
 Lobo
 Nils Lofgren
 Lone Justice
 Guy Lombardo
 Lord Tracy
 The Louvin Brothers
 Love
 Patty Loveless
 The Lovelites
 Lyle Lovett
 Love Unlimited
 Loretta Lynn
 L.T.D.
 Lynyrd Skynyrd
 Gloria Lynne
 Moms Mabley
 Willie Mabon
 Warner Mack
 Dave Mackay
 Miriam Makeba
 The Mamas and the Papas
 Melissa Manchester
 Barbara Mandrell
 Chuck Mangione
 Shelly Manne
 Wade Marcus
 Mark-Almond
 Pigmeat Markham
 Steve Marriott
 Wink Martindale
 Groucho Marx
 Hugh Masekela
 Dave Mason
 Jerry Mason
 Matthews Southern Comfort
 The Mavericks
 Robert Maxwell
 John Mayall
 Percy Mayfield
 Lyle Mays
 Les McCann
 Delbert McClinton
 Robert Lee McCollum
 Marilyn McCoo
 Van McCoy
 Jimmy McCracklin
 Jack McDuff
 Reba McEntire
 Gary McFarland
 Barry McGuire
 The McGuire Sisters
 Duff McKagan
 Maria McKee
 McKendree Spring
 Marian McPartland
 Clyde McPhatter
 Carmen McRae
 Jack McVea
 Meat Loaf
 John Mellencamp
 Memphis Slim
 Sergio Mendes
 Ethel Merman
 Pat Metheny
 Mighty Clouds of Joy
 Roger Miller
 Stephanie Mills
 The Mills Brothers
 Liza Minnelli
 Charles Mingus
 Joni Mitchell
 Bill Monroe
 Vaughn Monroe
 Buddy Montgomery
 Wes Montgomery
 The Moody Blues
 The Moonglows
 Jane Morgan
 Russ Morgan
 Ennio Morricone
 Mos Def
 Martin Mull
 Gerry Mulligan
 Milton Nascimento
 Johnny Nash
 Nazareth
 Nelson
 Jimmy Nelson
 Oliver Nelson
 Ricky Nelson
 Aaron Neville
 Art Neville
 The Neville Brothers
 New Edition
 New Riders of the Purple Sage
 Olivia Newton-John
 Night Ranger
 Leonard Nimoy
 Nine Inch Nails
 Nirvana
 Nitty Gritty Dirt Band
 No Doubt
 Ken Nordine
 Red Norvo
 Terri Nunn
 The Oak Ridge Boys
 Ric Ocasek
 Phil Ochs
 Hazel O'Connor
 Chico O'Farrill
 Oingo Boingo
 The O'Jays
 Spooner Oldham
 One Flew South
 Yoko Ono
 Orleans
 Jeffrey Osborne
 The Outfield
 Pablo Cruise
 Jackie Paris
 Leo Parker
 Junior Parker
 Ray Parker Jr.
 Dolly Parton
 Les Paul
 Freda Payne
 Peaches & Herb
 Pebbles
 CeCe Peniston
 The Peppermint Rainbow
 The Persuasions
 Bernadette Peters
 Tom Petty and the Heartbreakers
 John Phillips
 Webb Pierce
 Poco
 The Pointer Sisters
 The Police
 Doc Pomus
 Jimmy Ponder
 Iggy Pop
 Billy Preston
 Lloyd Price
 Louis Prima
 Primus
 Red Prysock
 Puddle of Mudd
 Leroy Pullins
 The Pussycat Dolls
 Quarterflash
 Queen Latifah
 Sun Ra
 The Radiants
 Gerry Rafferty
 Kenny Rankin
 The Ray Charles Singers
 The Ray-O-Vacs
 The Rays
 Dewey Redman
 Della Reese
 Martha Reeves
 R.E.M.
 Debbie Reynolds
 Emitt Rhodes
 Busta Rhymes
 Buddy Rich
 Emil Richards
 Dannie Richmond
 Riders in the Sky
 Stan Ridgway
 Sam Rivers
 Max Roach
 Howard Roberts
 Marty Roberts
 The Roches
 Chris Rock
 Tommy Roe
 Jimmy Rogers
 Sonny Rollins
 The Roots
 Rose Royce
 Doctor Ross
 Jackie Ross
 Rotary Connection
 Roswell Rudd
 Rufus
 Otis Rush
 Brenda Russell
 Leon Russell
 Pee Wee Russell
 The Russian Jazz Quartet
 Mitch Ryder
 Buffy Sainte-Marie
 Joe Sample
 Pharoah Sanders
 The Sandpipers
 Shirley Scott
 Tom Scott
 Dawn Sears
 Neil Sedaka
 Jeannie Seely
 Semisonic
 Charlie Sexton
 Tupac Shakur
 Georgie Shaw
 Marlena Shaw
 Archie Shepp
 Dinah Shore
 Ben Sidran
 Silver Apples
 Shel Silverstein
 The Simon Sisters
 Ashlee Simpson
 The Simpsons
 Zoot Sims
 P.F. Sloan
 Smash Mouth
 Kate Smith
 Keely Smith
 Tab Smith
 Patty Smyth
 Snoop Dogg
 Valaida Snow
 Jill Sobule
 Soft Machine
 Sonic Youth
 Sonny & Cher
 The Soul Stirrers
 Soundgarden
 Eddie South
 Southern Culture on the Skids
 The Sparkletones
 Spinal Tap
 The Spokesmen
 Squeeze
 Jo Stafford
 Chris Stamey
 Joe Stampley
 Michael Stanley
 Kay Starr
 Stealers Wheel
 Steely Dan
 Gwen Stefani
 Steppenwolf
 Cat Stevens
 Billy Stewart
 Sting
 Sonny Stitt
 Shane Stockton
 George Strait
 Strawberry Alarm Clock
 Strawbs
 Steve and Eydie
 Styx
 Sublime
 Sum 41
 Yma Sumac
 Andy Summers
 The Sundowners
 Supertramp
 The Surfaris
 Sylvia Syms
 Gábor Szabó
 The Tams
 Grady Tate
 t.A.T.u.
 Billy Taylor
 Koko Taylor
 Charlie Teagarden
 Temple of the Dog
 Clark Terry
 Tesla
 Sister Rosetta Tharpe
 Robin Thicke
 Toots Thielemans
 B.J. Thomas
 Irma Thomas
 Rufus Thomas
 Hank Thompson
 Lucky Thompson
 Big Mama Thornton
 Three Dog Night
 The Three Stooges
 Tiffany
 Mel Tillis
 Tommy & the Tom Toms
 Mel Tormé
 The Tragically Hip
 The Trapp Family Singers
 Ralph Tresvant
 Ernest Tubb
 The Tubes
 Tanya Tucker
 Tommy Tucker
 The Tune Weavers
 Ike Turner
 Stanley Turrentine
 Conway Twitty
 McCoy Tyner
 Phil Upchurch
 Michael Utley
 Leroy Van Dyke
 Gino Vannelli
 Van Zant
 Billy Vaughan
 Suzanne Vega
 Veruca Salt
 The Vibrations
 Bobby Vinton
 Voivod
 Porter Wagoner
 The Waikikis
 Rufus Wainwright
 Rick Wakeman
 Jerry Jeff Walker
 The Wallflowers
 Joe Walsh
 Wang Chung
 Clara Ward
 Warrior Soul
 War
 Washboard Sam
 Was (Not Was)
 Baby Washington
 The Watchmen
 Muddy Waters
 Jody Watley
 Johnny "Guitar" Watson
 The Weavers
 Ben Webster
 Weezer
 We Five
 George Wein
 Lenny Welch
 Lawrence Welk
 Kitty Wells
 Mae West
 Barry White
 Michael White
 Slappy White
 Whitesnake
 White Zombie
 The Who
 Whycliffe
 Kim Wilde
 Don Williams
 Jody Williams
 John Williams
 Larry Williams
 Lenny Williams
 Leona Williams
 Paul Williams
 Roger Williams
 Sonny Boy Williamson
 Walter Winchell
 Kai Winding
 Johnny Winter
 Wishbone Ash
 Jimmy Witherspoon
 Bobby Womack
 Lee Ann Womack
 Phil Woods
 Wrecks-N-Effect
 O. V. Wright
 Bill Wyman
 Rusty York
 Faron Young
 Neil Young
 Young Black Teenagers
 Y&T
 Rob Zombie

Subsequent legal documents filed by Universal Music Group in February 2020 cited four additional artists not included in the New York Times list:
 And You Will Know Us by the Trail of Dead
 David Baerwald
 Michael McDonald
 Slayer

See also

 2008 in music
 2008 in the United States
 List of building or structure fires
 1937 Fox vault fire, destroyed many of the studio's pre-1932 silent films
 1965 MGM vault fire, destroyed many of the studio's silent and early sound films
 Myspace, another company involved in a loss of music that also went unreported by the media until 2019

References

2008 in American cinema
Universal fire, 2008
Universal fire, 2008
Universal Studios Hollywood
Building and structure fires in the United States
Universal fire
June 2008 events in the United States
History of Los Angeles County, California
Mass media-related controversies in the United States

2008 controversies
2019 controversies
2020 controversies
Universal Music Group
Warehouse fires
Fires in California